Thom Beck (died October 15, 1986) was a founding member of The Credibility Gap while at KRLA 1110 radio, where he also narrated part of the Pop Chronicles. He was kept on as a journalist at KRLA 1110 when Lew Irwin was brought in create the new news program that became the Credibility Gap.  He worked as a reporter at KCBS in San Francisco and as a disc jockey at KIIS, 1970-1972 in between stints at KRLA, which he left in 1976.  He is deceased.

Discography 
1968 - An Album Of Political Pornography, with Lew Irwin and the Credibility Gap (Blue Thumb)

Online sources

External links
 Los Angeles Radio People, B

References

Radio personalities from Los Angeles
Year of birth missing
1986 deaths